Bruce Nelson may refer to:
Bruce Nelson (historian), historian and labor scholar at Dartmouth College
Bruce Nelson (naval architect), yacht designer for the America One challenge
Bruce Nelson (businessman) (born 1944), chief executive officer of Office Depot
Bruce Nelson (American football) (born 1979), University of Iowa football player drafted by the Carolina Panthers in the 2003 NFL Draft
Bruce Jay Nelson (1952–1999), inventor of the remote procedure call for computer communications